Saint-Léonard is a community in Madawaska County, New Brunswick, Canada. It held town status prior to 2023.

History

Saint-Léonard was once a popular town during Prohibition in the United States as it was easy to smuggle alcohol to Van Buren.

The town's economy is driven by potato farming and a J.D. Irving Limited sawmill. Saint-Léonard is officially bilingual but it is predominantly a Francophone community.

On June 30, 2008, a truck carrying 12 million bees overturned near Saint-Léonard. This accident was the first of its kind in New Brunswick.

On 1 January 2023, Saint-Léonard amalgamated with the village of Sainte-Anne-de-Madawaska and parts of four local service districts to form the new town of Vallée-des-Rivières. The community's name remains in official use.

Geography
It is located on the east bank of the Saint John River opposite Van Buren, Maine, to which it is connected via the Saint Leonard–Van Buren Bridge.

Climate
The town has a warm-summer humid continental climate (Köppen: Dfb), even for this type of climate the warm season can be milder for a non-coastal city like Saint John, because the Great Lakes and Appalachians hold much of the heat. that come from the Gulf of Mexico and the interior of the United States. But winters are substantially cold with spring and fall with pleasant temperatures.

Demographics

Mother tongue language (2006)

Education
It has a single school, École Grande-Rivière.

Notable people

See also
List of communities in New Brunswick

References

External links

Town of Saint-Leonard

Communities in Madawaska County, New Brunswick
Former towns in New Brunswick
New Brunswick populated places on the Saint John River (Bay of Fundy)